The women's long jump event  at the 2006 IAAF World Indoor Championships was held on March 11–12.

Medalists

Note: The gold medal had been originally won by Tatyana Kotova of Russia but her result was later voided as a banned substance was found in her retested sample from the 2005 World Championships.

Results

Qualification
Qualifying performance 6.55 (Q) or 8 best performers (q) advanced to the Final.

Final

References
Results
Updated results

Long
Long jump at the World Athletics Indoor Championships
2006 in women's athletics